Abundance Investment (formerly Abundance Generation) is a UK-based online investment platform which claims to offer ethical and socially beneficial investments that contribute to a green economy. 

Investments offered are mainly renewable energy projects in the UK, with investors receiving a share of the profits from the generation and sale of low-carbon electricity.

Abundance Investment is authorised and regulated by the Financial Conduct Authority in the UK.

Risks of investing in renewable energy
All investment carries risk, and Abundance, as a regulated crowdfunding platform, is required to clearly set out these risks for all potential investors. For renewable energy projects, something could go wrong and an investor may not get back all or any of their original investment. 

Abundance debentures are usually long-term investments which investors should expect to hold for the full 20 years. Although Abundance facilitates a process for debentures to be bought and sold before the end of their life, there is no guarantee that this can be done, or what the value will be. However, 2015 saw Abundance raise over £2 million for its first short-term debenture—one year—supporting the construction of a wind turbine, which it expects to re-finance with a long-term debenture.

History and aims
Abundance is based in London, UK and launched to the public in April 2012. The company was set up in 2009 and went through a two year process to become the first community finance platform / crowdfunding platform to be authorised and regulated by the Financial Services Authority (now the Financial Conduct Authority).

Abundance aims to support projects that deliver benefits for society and the environment, including renewable energy.

As of May 2017, £40.5 million has been invested in 24 projects, including a 500 kWp turbine in Gloucestershire, a residential solar project in the South Downs, biomass boilers on the Welsh border and free solar power for various schools across the UK.

Returns
Abundance is like a building society for low carbon technology, offering a lower-risk crowd funding opportunity. Investors put money towards specific renewable energy projects and receive a return based on the green electricity generated.

Abundance projects make use of different types of debentures—for example, some are fixed-return and some are variable-return debentures.

The website
Abundance operates through its online platform, with individuals able to deposit money online and then invest in specific projects according to their preferences.

For renewable energy projects the Abundance website lets investors view how much electricity their projects are generating, depending on how windy or sunny it is. Abundance Investment has recently launched the ability to hold debentures in a Self-invested personal pension (SIPP), and debentures can be held in an Innovative Finance ISA (IF ISA).

See also
Comparison of crowd funding services
Energy4All

References

External links
 
 

Peer-to-peer lending companies